Elida or Élida is a given name. Notable people with the name include:
Elida Almeida (born 1993), Cape Verdean singer
Elidà Amigó i Montanya (1935-2020), Andorran historian, archivist, activist, and suffragist
Elida Campodónico, Panamanian teacher, women's rights advocate and attorney
Elida Gera (1931-2017), Israeli film director, dancer, and choreographer
Elida Morris (1886-1977), American vaudeville singer, comedian and actress
 Élida Passo (1867–1893), Argentine pharmacist
Elida Rumsey (1842-1819), singer, philanthropist, and Union nurse during the American Civil War
 Elida Reyna (born 1972), Tejano singer
Élida Stantic (born  1942), better known as Lita Stantic, Argentine cinema producer, screenplay writer, and director
Élida Vigo,  Argentine politician
Judith Elida Acuña,  Argentine politician

See also